Different Strokes is the fourth album by Louisville, Kentucky group The Nite-Liters, the instrumental ensemble offshoot of New Birth, featuring Tony Churchill, James Baker, Robin Russell, Austin Lander, Robert "Lurch" Jackson, Leroy Taylor, Charlie Hearndon. 

The album was released in 1972 on RCA Records and produced by mentor Harvey Fuqua.

Track listing
"Do the Granny"   	 3:06   	
"Money Runner (From the film Dollars)" 	3:25 	
"Stop, Look, Listen" 	5:06 	
"Theme from Angela" 	4:07 	
"Funky-Vamp" 	5:03 	
"Maynard Ferguson's Theme" 	5:51 	
"Theme from Buck & the Preacher" 	4:03 	
"Back Down Home" 	3:28 	
"Skimo's Theme" 	4:41

References

External links
 The Nite-Liters-Different Strokes at Discogs

1972 albums
The Nite-Liters albums
RCA Records albums
Albums produced by Harvey Fuqua